Daddy Was a Number Runner is the first novel by Louise Meriwether. It was published by Prentice Hall, with a foreword by James Baldwin, in 1970, and is now considered a modern classic. It depicts a poor black family in Harlem during the Great Depression in the first half of the 20th century, as seen through the eyes of a 12-year-old African-American girl who has one brother who wants to be a chemist and another who is a gang member.

Reception
Paule Marshall said of the book:
[Its] greatest achievement lies in the sense of black life that it conveys: vitality and force behind the despair. It celebrates the positive values behind the black experience: the tenderness and love that often lie underneath the abrasive surfaces of relationships … the humor that has long been an important part of the black survival kit, and the heroism of ordinary folk … a most important novel.
It was an Essence Book Club Choice in December 2002.

References

Further reading
 Demirtürk, E. Lâle, "Writing the Urban Discourse into the Black Ghetto Imaginary: Louise Meriwether's 'Daddy Was a Number Runner", Southern Literary Journal, Autumn 2006, Vol. 39 Issue 1, p. 71.

1970 American novels
African-American novels
Novels set in Manhattan
Harlem in fiction
1970 debut novels
Prentice Hall books